Money Creek may refer to:

Communities
United States
Money Creek Township, McLean County, Illinois
Money Creek Township, Houston County, Minnesota
Money Creek, Minnesota, an unincorporated community

Streams
Money Creek (Illinois), a stream in Illinois
Money Creek (Root River), a stream in Minnesota
Money Creek (Washington), a stream in Washington

See also
Money Run (West Virginia)